Positive Reaction may refer to:

 Positive Reaction (album), a 1990 album by Caveman
 Positive Reaction (song), a 1988 song by Mandy